Nelson Chia is a Singaporean theatre director, actor and lecturer. He is the co-founder of Nine Years Theatre.

Early life and education
Chia studied at The Chinese High School and Hwa Chong Junior College. He holds a Bachelor of Arts in Theatre Studies from National University of Singapore and a master's degree in Theatre Arts (Directing) from Goldsmiths College, University of London.

Career 
Chia has been working in theatre both as an actor and director since 1994. Chia's first major TV role in the drama Together Whenever, which was aired on SPH MediaWorks Channel U, alongside Erica Lee. He briefly headed the Department of Theatre in Nanyang Academy of Fine Arts, but later left the post in order to devote more time to his craft. He is currently an adjunct lecturer with the Department of Theatre in Nanyang Academy of Fine Arts as well as the Theatre Studies Program in National University of Singapore. He is the associate artistic director at Toy Factory Productions (formerly Toy Factory Theatre Ensemble), an Associate Artist with The Substation and the founding member of a collaborative ensemble A Group Of People.

Chia founded Mandarin theatre company Nine Years Theatre in 2012.

Personal life 
Chia is married to fellow theatre practitioner and co-founder of Nine Years Theatre Mia Chee, and has two twin daughters (born 2004).

Theatre

As director
 Rosencrantz and Guildenstern Are Dead, Goldsmiths College, London, 2000
 Animal Farm (in Mandarin, 動物農莊), The Theatre Practice, Victoria Theatre, Singapore, 2002
 Oleanna (in Mandarin, 奧里安娜), The Theatre Practice, Singapore, 2002
 Mergers And Wills (in Mandarin, 暗流胸涌), (as co-Director), Toy Factory Productions, Singapore, 2004
 First Light, Toy Factory Productions, Esplanade Theatre Studio, Singapore, 2008
 LIV - Full Frontal, A Group of People, Esplanade Theatre Studio, Singapore Arts Festival, Singapore, 2009
Who's Afraid of Virginia Woolf?, Nine Years Theatre, Esplanade Theatre Studio, Huayi Festival 2012, Singapore 2012
Twelve Angry Men, Nine Years Theatre, Esplanade Theatre Studio, Huayi Festival 2013, Singapore 2013
Who's Afraid of Virginia Woolf?, Nine Years Theatre, Dom Pedro V Theatre, Macau Arts Festival 2013, Singapore 2013

As an actor
 Lao Jiu (in Mandarin, 老九), The Theatre Practice, Singapore, 1990
 Titoudao (in Mandarin, 剃頭刀), Toy Factory Productions, Singapore, 1994
 The Coffin is Too Big For The Hole (in Mandarin, 棺材太大洞太小), The Theatre Practice, Singapore, 1995
 The Soldier and His Wife (in Mandarin, 都是當兵惹得禍), The Theatre Practice, Fort Canning Drama Centre, Singapore, 1996
 Love A La Zen (in Mandarin, 愛情觀自在), The Theatre Practice, Victoria Theatre, Singapore, 1999
 A Midsummer Night’s Dream (in Mandarin, 仲夏夜之夢), The Theatre Practice, Singapore, 1999
 Hundred Years In Waiting (in Mandarin, 百年的等待), The Theatre Practice, Singapore, 2001
 The Island (in Mandarin, 島), (as John), The Theatre Practice, Singapore, 2002
 Animal Farm (in Mandarin, 動物農莊), The Theatre Practice, Victoria Theatre, Singapore, 2002
 Mad Phoenix (in Mandarin, 南海十三郎), (as Title Role), Toy Factory Productions, Esplanade Theatre Studio, Huayi Festival, Singapore, 2003
 Porcelain, (as John Lee), Toy Factory Productions, Singapore, 2005
 Big Fool Lee (in Mandarin and Cantonese, 李大傻), Toy Factory Productions, Singapore, 2005
 Nanjing: 1937, The Substation, The Substation SeptFest, Singapore, 2007
 Nanjing: 1937 Phase II, The Substation, The Substation SeptFest, Singapore, 2008
 Own Time Own Target, W!LD RICE, Drama Centre Theatre, Singapore, 2009

Filmography
Film

Television

2006
 Crossfire 針鋒相對 (forum programme, in Mandarin), (as host), Mediacorp Channel U

References

Singaporean male television actors
Singaporean people of Chinese descent
Male actors of Chinese descent
Living people
National University of Singapore alumni
Alumni of Goldsmiths, University of London
Hwa Chong Junior College alumni
Hwa Chong Institution alumni
Year of birth missing (living people)